Samsan-dong is a dong, or neighborhood, of Nam-gu in Ulsan, South Korea. Samsan literally translates as "three mountains". It is Ulsan's downtown area.

History
1911 Previously Jungri, Samsan, Shilli, Daehyeon-myeon
1914 Renamed to Samsanri-ro, Ulsan-gun
June 1, 1962 Samsan-dong, Ulsan-si (city promotion in status)
1972 Incorporated to Daldong, Ulsan-si
March 2, 1995 Divided into Samsan-dong, Dal-dong
July 15, 1997 Samsan-dong, Nam-gu, Ulsan Metropolitan City (promotion in status to metropolitan city)

Schools
Samsan Elementary School
Paekhap Elementary School
Samshin Elementary School
Ulsan Gangnam Middle School 
Samsan High School

See also
South Korea portal

References

External links
Ulsan Namgu home page

Nam District, Ulsan
Neighbourhoods in South Korea